Monstera anomala is a flowering plant of genus Monstera and family Araceae.

References 

anomala